This is a list of ambassadors of the United States to Kosovo. The ambassador is the head of the Embassy of the United States in Pristina.

The formal title for ambassadors is Ambassador Extraordinary and Plenipotentiary. Heads of the US Office that existed prior to US recognition of Kosovo's independence and the opening of the US Embassy in 2008 were titled Chief of Mission and were often of Ambassadorial rank. The ambassador to Kosovo must be confirmed by the Senate.

President Joe Biden nominated career US diplomat and deputy chief of the US Embassy in Ankara, Turkey Jeff Hovenier for the position on June 2, 2021. He was confirmed by the Senate on November 18, 2021.

Ambassadors

See also
Kosovo–United States relations
Foreign relations of Kosovo
Ambassadors of the United States

References

United States Department of State: Background notes on Kosovo

External links
 United States Department of State: Chiefs of Mission for Kosovo
 United States Department of State: Kosovo
 United States Embassy in Pristina

Kosove

Kosovo diplomacy-related lists